Calvisia may refer to:
 Calvisia gens, a Roman family called gens Calvisia
 Calvisia (insect), a genus of stick insects in the subfamily Necrosciinae

See also
Calvisio, a frazione (and parish) of the municipality of Finale Ligure, in Liguria, northern Italy